Lilia Fisikovici (born 29 March 1989) is a Moldovan long distance runner who specialises in the marathon. She competed in the women's marathon event at the 2016 Summer Olympics. She qualified to represent Moldova again at the 2020 Summer Olympics.

In 2018, at the Ljubljana Marathon held in Ljubljana, Slovenia, she set a new Moldovan marathon record with a time of 2:28:26. In 2020, she competed in the women's half marathon at the 2020 World Athletics Half Marathon Championships held in Gdynia, Poland.

References

External links
 

1989 births
Living people
Moldovan female long-distance runners
Moldovan female marathon runners
Place of birth missing (living people)
Athletes (track and field) at the 2016 Summer Olympics
Athletes (track and field) at the 2020 Summer Olympics
Olympic athletes of Moldova